Artashes Geghamyan (born 2 December 1949) is an Armenian politician.

Biography 
Geghamyan, born in Yerevan. He finished "Chekhov Secondary School" in 1966 and graduated from the Yerevan Polytechnic Institute in 1971. He joined the Communist Party of the Soviet Union in 1972. From 1989 to 1990 he was the Mayor of Yerevan.

In 1990, he quit the Communist Party. From 1995 to 1999 he served as a deputy of the National Assembly. He is the leader of the National Unity Party which he founded in April 1997. In the 2003 presidential election, Geghamyan was a candidate, receiving 16.9% of the vote in the first round.

In the February 2008 presidential election, Geghamyan, running again as the National Unity Party's candidate, placed seventh with 0.27% of the vote according to final official results.

Personal life 
Artashes Geghamyan is married and has two sons and grandchildren.

References

External links
 Artashes Geghamyan at Armenia pedia

1949 births
Living people
National Polytechnic University of Armenia alumni
Candidates for President of Armenia
Members of the National Assembly (Armenia)
Communist Party of Armenia (Soviet Union) politicians
National Unity (Armenia) politicians
Mayors of Yerevan